The X53 was a bus service between Stirling and Kinross, Scotland.

History 
The route was introduced on 14 September 2020 as a partial replacement of the withdrawn 23 Stirling–St Andrews route operated by Stagecoach.

In November 2021, First announced that the route would be suspended in January unless more drivers became available to operate it. In early December, a local MSP Mark Ruskell met with First to discuss the withdrawal of the route. First continued to cite a lack of drivers as the reason for withdrawal. On 15 December 2021, the planned withdrawal of the route was discussed during a debate in the Scottish Parliament. However, on 20 December, First Bus confirmed that the route would be withdrawn as planned. The route was suspended on 10 January 2022 during a timetable change that also saw the frequency of other routes reduced from half-hourly to hourly.

A temporary service, numbered 202, was introduced by Perth and Kinross Council and Bay Travel on 10 January. It runs between Kinross and Tillicoultry, where passengers can change for the First Bus service 52 to Stirling. The route will operate until March, at which time Bay Travel will assess the viability of continuing the service.

Operation 
The route was operated commercially by First. It had a frequency of approximately one bus every two hours.

References 

Bus routes in Scotland